Chak Dana also spelled as Chakdana is a village in Shaheed Bhagat Singh Nagar district of Punjab State, India. The village is administrated by Sarpanch an elected representative of the village.

Demography 
As of 2011, Chak Dana has a total number of 343 houses and population of 1647 of which 831 include are males while 816 are females according to the report published by Census India in 2011. The literacy rate of Chak Dana is 86.14%, higher than the state average of 75.84%. The population of children under the age of 6 years is 139 which is 8.44% of total population of Chak Dana, and child sex ratio is approximately 829 as compared to Punjab state average of 846.

Most of the people are from Schedule Caste which constitutes 7.59% of total population in Chak Dana. The town does not have any Schedule Tribe population so far.

As per the report published by Census India in 2011, 471 people were engaged in work activities out of the total population of Chak Dana which includes 426 males and 45 females. According to census survey report 2011, 92.14% workers describe their work as main work and 7.86% workers are involved in Marginal activity providing livelihood for less than 6 months.

Education 
The village has a Punjabi medium, co-ed upper primary with secondary school founded in 1969. The schools provide mid-day meal as per Indian Midday Meal Scheme and the meal prepared in school premises. As per Right of Children to Free and Compulsory Education Act the school provide free education to children between the ages of 6 and 14.

Amardeep Singh Shergill Memorial college Mukandpur and Sikh National College Banga are the nearest colleges.

Transport 

See also 
List of villages in India

References

External links 
 Tourism of Punjab 
 Census of Punjab
 Locality Based PINCode

Villages in Shaheed Bhagat Singh Nagar district